Katherine Hall Page (born July 7, 1947) is an American writer of cozy mysteries. Page has written twenty-five books in her Faith Fairchild series and four Christie and Company juvenile mysteries. Page has won three Agatha Awards and been nominated for two Edgar Awards. She was also the 2016 lifetime achievement recipient at the Malice Domestic convention.

Early life and education
Page was born on July 7, 1947 in New Jersey. For her post-secondary education, Page started with a Bachelor of Arts from Wellesley College in 1969 and a Master of Education from Tufts University in 1974. She later received a Doctor of Education from Harvard University in 1985.

Career
From the 1960s to 1980s, Page worked with teenagers in special education while teaching history and art. She continued her educational career as a consultant in 1985. In 1990, Page wrote The Body in the Belfry as a stand-alone book. After her editor asked when the next story in the series would be written, Page created the Faith Fairchild books with the publication of The Body in the Kelp. While writing The Body in the Fjord, Page expanded her writing to juvenile mysteries in the late 1990s. After publishing Christie and Company in 1996, Page added three more books to the Christie and Company series throughout the remainder of the 1990s. In 2019, her Faith Fairchild series grew to twenty five books after the release of The Body in the Wake.

Writing style and themes
Page bases the Faith Fairchild series around the criminal and methodology of the crime while planning out her characters, dialogue and timeline of events. For her locations, Page merged neighboring towns of Boston, Massachusetts to create her fictional town of Aleford. Her other fictional location, Sanpere Island, is based on Deer Isle, Maine. From her third Faith Fairchild book onwards, Page used her made-up town of Aleford in every other book while incorporating other American and European locations. With her fourth book, Page started to include accompanying recipes that were part of her stories. In 1998, Page used a home burglary she experienced as the basis for her book The Body in the Bookcase.

Awards and honors
From 1990 to 2010, Page was nominated for six Agatha Awards and won three times. Her Agatha wins include the 1990 Best First Novel for The Body in the Belfry and the 2005 Best Novel for The Body in the Snowdrift. At the Edgar Awards, Page was nominated for the 1998 Best Juvenile with Christie & Company Down East and 2004 Mary Higgins Clark Award with The Body in the Lighthouse. In 2016, Page was selected to receive a lifetime achievement award at the Malice Domestic convention.

Personal life
Page is married and has one child.

References

American mystery writers
Place of birth missing (living people)
Agatha Award winners
Living people
Tufts University School of Arts and Sciences alumni
Wellesley College alumni
Harvard Graduate School of Education alumni
1947 births